Éxitos En Vivo is the title of a live album released by Tejano music group La Mafia from Monterrey Nuevo León Mexico on February 28, 1995. This album became their first number-one set on the Billboard Top Latin Albums chart. It received a nomination for a Grammy Award for Best Mexican/Mexican-American Album.

Track listing
Source: Billboard.

Chart performance

See also
List of number-one Billboard Top Latin Albums from the 1990s
List of number-one Billboard Latin Pop Albums from the 1990s

References

La Mafia live albums
Spanish-language live albums
1995 live albums
Sony Music Latin live albums